Angela Knight is an American author of mostly erotic fantasy.

Career

She was a reporter for ten years and a comic book author. She lives in South Carolina. First published under Red Sage, she was able to write romantic fiction for the first time in 1996. She published several short stories in their Secrets anthologies. Editor Cindy Hwang brought her to Berkley Publishing and has helped her become a best selling author.

When developing her Mageverse series she wanted to create a unique spin on the vampire tale. Taking the Arthurian legend and twisting it, she has vampires that are not evil, still possess their souls, and can reproduce. 

Jane's Warlord introduces Jane Colby, a 20th-century reporter. 

Mercenaries is three short stories (originally published electronically) set in a future like Baran's.

Bibliography

Mageverse series

The Once and Future Lover (2001), in Wicked Games
Seduction's Gift (2005), in Hot Blooded 
Master of the Night (2005)
Galahad  (2004), in Bite
Master of the Moon (2005)
Master of Wolves (2006)
Moon Dance (2007), in Over the Moon
Master of Swords (2008)
Master of Dragons (2007)
Vampire's Ball  (2009), in Hot For the Holidays and Paranormal Holiday Anthology Trio
Master of Fire (2010)
Master of Smoke (2011)
Master of Shadows (2012)
Master of Darkness (2011)
Oath of Service (2014) in Love Bites
Master of Magic (2017)
Master of Seduction (2017)
 Master of Valor (201?)

Forever Kiss series

The Forever Kiss
Soul Kisses in Secrets 14

Talent Series 

Arcane Kiss (2017)
Arcane Heart (2018)

Time Hunters series 

Jane’s Warlord (2007)
Warfem  (2005) novella published in Warlord (2007)  and in the anthology Kick @$$ (2005) 
The Warlord and the Fem  (2007) published in Warlord
Baby, You've Changed  (2007) published in Warlord
Warrior (2008)
Guardian (2009)
Enforcer (2013) published in the anthology Unbound

Other books
 Mercenaries (2005)
Captive Dreams (2005)
Beyond the Dark  (2007)
Without Restraint (2015)
The Forever Kiss (2004)
Hope's Kiss (2011), ebook
Blood and Steel (2011), ebook
Voodoo (2005),  ebook sequel to Hero Sandwich found in Hard Candy
Passionate Ink: A Guide to Writing Erotic Romance (2007)
The Dark One (2004), ebook
The Dhampir (2010)
Armored Hearts (2015)
Mistletoe and Masks (2016)
Frosty the Snow Dom (2017)

Anthologies and collections 
These are books that include short stories by Angela Knight along with other authors.

References

External links
 Official Website of Angela Knight
 Official Angela Knight Group
 Angela Knight at Berkley/Jove Authors
 Angela Knight at Paranormal Romance Writers

Year of birth missing (living people)
Living people
20th-century American novelists
21st-century American novelists
American erotica writers
American romantic fiction writers
American women novelists
American women short story writers
Women romantic fiction writers
Women erotica writers
20th-century American short story writers
21st-century American short story writers
20th-century American women writers
21st-century American women writers